Clarence Birdseye (December 9, 1886 – October 7, 1956) was an American inventor, entrepreneur, and naturalist, considered the founder of the modern frozen food industry. He founded the frozen food company Birds Eye. Among his inventions during his career was the double belt freezer.

One of nine children, Birdseye grew up in Brooklyn before heading to Amherst College and began his scientific career with the U.S. government. A biography of his life was published by Doubleday over a half century after his death.

Early life and education 
Clarence Birdseye was the sixth of nine children of Clarence Frank Birdseye, a lawyer in an insurance firm, and Ada Jane Underwood. His first years were spent in Brooklyn, New York, where his family owned a townhouse in Cobble Hill. From childhood, Birdseye was obsessed with natural science and with taxidermy, which he taught himself by correspondence. At the age of eleven he advertised his courses in the subject. When he was fourteen, the family moved to the suburb of Montclair, New Jersey, where Birdseye graduated from  Montclair High School. He matriculated at Amherst College, where his father and elder brother had earned degrees. There he excelled at science, although an average student in other subjects. His obsession with collecting insects led his college classmates to nickname him "Bugs".

In the summer after his freshman year, Birdseye worked for the United States Department of Agriculture (USDA) in New Mexico and Arizona as an “assistant naturalist”, at a time when the agency was concerned with helping farmers and ranchers get rid of predators, chiefly coyotes.

In 1908, family finances forced Birdseye to withdraw from college after his second year. In 1917, Birdseye's father and elder brother Kellogg went to prison for defrauding their employer; whether this was related to Birdseye's withdrawal from Amherst is unclear.

Birdseye was once again hired by the USDA, this time for a project surveying animals in the American West. He also worked with entomologist Willard Van Orsdel King (1888–1970) in Montana, where, in 1910 and 1911, he captured several hundred small mammals from which King removed several thousand ticks for research, isolating them as the cause of Rocky Mountain spotted fever, a breakthrough.
Birdseye's next field assignment, intermittently from 1912 to 1915, was in Labrador in the Dominion of Newfoundland (now part of Canada), where he became further interested in food preservation by freezing, especially fast freezing. He purchased land at Muddy Bay, where he built a ranch for raising foxes. He was taught by the Inuit how to ice fish under very thick ice. In -40 °C weather, he discovered that the fish he caught froze almost instantly, and when thawed, tasted fresh. He recognized immediately that the frozen seafood sold in New York was of lower quality than the frozen fish of Labrador, and that this knowledge could be lucrative. This 1920s hunting trip to Canada inspired Birdseye's food preserving method.

When food is frozen slowly, at temperatures near the freezing point, ice crystals form within the animal or vegetable cells; when the food thaws, cellular fluid leaks from the damaged tissue, giving the food a mushy or dry consistency. Rapid freezing, at lower temperatures, gives crystals less time to form and thus does less damage.

In 1922, Birdseye conducted fish-freezing experiments at the Clothel Refrigerating Company, and then established his own company, Birdseye Seafoods Inc., to freeze fish fillets with chilled air at −43 °C (−45 °F). In 1924, his company went bankrupt for lack of consumer interest in the product. That same year, he developed an entirely new process for commercially viable quick-freezing: packing fish in cartons, then freezing the contents between two refrigerated surfaces under pressure. Birdseye created General Seafood Corporation to promote this method.

Industrial development
In 1925, General Seafood Corporation moved to Gloucester, Massachusetts. There it marketed and sold Birdseye's newest invention, the double belt freezer, in which cold brine chilled a pair of stainless steel belts carrying packaged fish, freezing the fish quickly. His invention was issued US Patent #1,773,079, considered by some as the beginning of today's frozen foods industry. Birdseye patented other machinery which cooled even more quickly. In 1927, he patented the multiplate freezing machine which was used as the basis for freezing food for several decades.

In 1929, Birdseye sold his company and patents for $22 million (approximately $335 million in 2021 dollars) to Goldman Sachs and the Postum Company, which eventually became General Foods Corporation. General Foods founded the Birds Eye Frozen Food Company. Birdseye continued to work with the company, further developing frozen food technology. In 1930, the company began sales experiments in 18 retail stores around Springfield, Massachusetts, to test consumer acceptance of quick-frozen foods. The initial product line featured 26 items, including 18 cuts of frozen meat, spinach and peas, a variety of fruits and berries, blue point oysters, and fish fillets. Consumers liked the new products, and today this is considered the birth of retail frozen foods. The "Birds Eye" name remains a leading frozen-food brand. In 1949, Birdseye won the Institute of Food Technologists' Babcock-Hart Award. Birdseye was inducted into the National Inventors Hall of Fame in 2005.

Death
Birdseye died on October 7, 1956, of a heart attack at the Gramercy Park Hotel at the age of 69. He was cremated and his ashes were scattered in the sea off the coast of Gloucester, Massachusetts.

Legacy 
In 2012 a book-length biography of Birdseye, Mark Kurlansky's Birdseye: The Adventures of a Curious Man, was published by Doubleday.

Birdseye inventions related to food products

References

Further reading
 "Clarence Birdseye" – Food Engineering. September 2003. p. 66.
 About.com biography
 History of Rocky Mountain Labs, National Institute of Allergy and Infectious Disease 
 Birdseye, Clarence & Eleanor G. (1951). Growing Woodland Plants. New York: Dover Publications, Inc.

External links

 Clarence Birdseye (AC 1910) Field Journals at the Amherst College Archives & Special Collections
 Clarence Birdseye biography at Birds Eye Foods web site
 List of IFT Award winners

1886 births
1956 deaths
20th-century American inventors
American food engineers
American food company founders
American food scientists
Amherst College alumni
Businesspeople from New York City
Food preservation
Heating, ventilation, and air conditioning
Montclair High School (New Jersey) alumni
People from Montclair, New Jersey
Scientists from New York (state)
20th-century American businesspeople
Post Holdings
General Foods